Wiener Platz is an interchange station and hub on the Cologne Stadtbahn lines 4, 13 and 18 in the Cologne district of Mülheim. The station is located at Wiener Platz, the center of Mülheim.

The station consists of an at-grade station for line 4 and an underground station for line 13 and 18. The underground station was opened in 1997.

Services 
Transport service is provided by Stadtbahn trains and interconnecting bus lines.

Notable places nearby 
 St. Clemens and Friedenskirche
 Stadtgarten and Stadthaus
 Frankfurter Straße shopping district

See also 
 List of Cologne KVB stations

References

External links 
 
 station info page 
 station layout diagram 

Cologne KVB stations
Mülheim, Cologne
Railway stations in Germany opened in 1997